The name Franklin has been used for three tropical cyclones in the Atlantic Ocean, replacing Floyd after 1999.
 Tropical Storm Franklin (2005) - Formed over the Bahamas, then moved erratically in the open ocean, never affecting land directly; twice approached hurricane status.
 Tropical Storm Franklin (2011) - Weak tropical storm that never threatened land.
 Hurricane Franklin (2017) - Made landfall on the  Yucatán Peninsula as a moderate tropical storm, then made a second landfall in Veracruz, Mexico as a Category 1 hurricane.

Atlantic hurricane set index articles